Anthony Carroll Knowles (born January 1, 1943) is an American politician and businessman who served as the seventh governor of Alaska from 1994 to 2002. Barred from seeking a third consecutive term as governor in 2002, he ran unsuccessfully for the U.S. Senate in 2004 and again for governor in 2006. In September 2008, Knowles became president of the National Energy Policy Institute, a non-profit energy policy organization funded by billionaire George Kaiser's family foundation, and located at the University of Tulsa.

Knowles was discussed as a potential Secretary of the Interior or Secretary of Energy in an Obama cabinet, but in December 2008, Knowles was passed over in favor of Steven Chu as Energy secretary. He was also passed over in favor of Ken Salazar as Interior secretary. On April 28, 2010, Knowles was appointed to the National Park System Advisory Board by Secretary of the Interior Ken Salazar.

Earlier life
Knowles was born in Tulsa, Oklahoma.  He volunteered for the United States Army in 1962, joining the 82nd Airborne Division, and later served in Vung Tau, Vietnam.  Knowles achieved passage of legislation to create guaranteed veterans housing in the state's Pioneer's Homes, and honored their service through official days of recognition and the naming of Mount POW/MIA.

He earned a degree in economics from Yale University in 1968. There, he was a Delta Kappa Epsilon fraternity (Phi chapter) brother of George W. Bush. After graduation, he moved to Alaska and worked on oil drilling rigs on the North Slope and in Cook Inlet. In 1969, Knowles started his first of four restaurants including the Downtown Deli & Café in Anchorage.

An avid fly fisherman, cross-country skier, and (retired) marathon runner, Tony Knowles and his wife, former First Lady of Alaska Susan Knowles, currently reside in Anchorage, Alaska.  They have three children, Devon, Luke, and Sara. His older brother, Porter Knowles, resides in Kansas.

Political career
After three terms in the Anchorage Assembly, he served two terms as mayor of Anchorage from 1982 to 1987. Knowles first ran for governor in 1990. He won the Democratic nomination, but was defeated by the AKIP nominee, former Governor Walter Hickel. In 1994, he defeated former lieutenant governor Stephen McAlpine in the Democratic primary and was elected governor in the general election. Knowles's election was surprisingly close, but he also benefitted from the split conservative vote due to a strong third-party gubernatorial bid by the sitting lieutenant governor. In the election, Knowles received 41.1%, Republican candidate Jim Campbell 40.8% and lieutenant governor Jack Coghill of the Alaskan Independence Party 13%.

Knowles won the 1998 election in a landslide, defeating Republican John Lindauer 51%-18%. Knowles's margin of victory in this race was due largely to a collapsed campaign from Republican John Lindauer, controversy surrounding Lindauer and his misrepresentation of facts on campaign finance documents, and questions about Lindauer's state residency. Republican Robin L. Taylor, who was defeated in the primary by Lindauer, garnered 20% of the vote after announcing his write-in campaign only one week prior to the election. Knowles did not run for reelection in 2002 due to a consecutive two-term limit. Alaska law allows for more terms, but requires a break between two consecutive terms and a third.

During the September 11 attacks, Korean Air Flight 85 from Seoul was feared to have been hijacked. Worried that a possible hijacked plane might strike a target in Alaska, Governor Tony Knowles ordered the evacuation of large hotels and government buildings in Anchorage.

Knowles was chair of the Western Governors' Association in 1997, two-term chair of the Interstate Oil & Gas Compact Commission, and a member of the Pew Oceans Commission (POC).

During his term, Knowles established Denali Kid Care, which provides basic health care for 25,000 children and 5,000 pregnant women. The National Child Welfare League named Knowles as their Child Advocate of the Year in 1998.

A strong supporter of the Alaska National Guard, Knowles was recipient of the Guard's Pro Patria award and the 2001 Charles Dick Silver Medal of Merit.

Governor Knowles forged the "Millennium Agreement", a government-to-government agreement with tribes to foster rural delivery of services and economic development. He earned special recognition by the National Congress of American Indians in 2001 and, with Marshall Lind, the 2002 Alaska Federation of Natives Denali Award, the highest award given to a non-native.

Knowles pushed Canadian officials to adopt his "safe passage" principle to protect Pacific salmon and their freshwater habitat, leading to the successful negotiation of the first coast wide salmon treaty in decades.

During his final term as governor, Republicans in the Alaska Legislature attacked him as a weak leader who avoided taking a position on several issues, as exemplified by their "Where's Tony?" campaign.

In 2004, he ran for the United States Senate, as the Democratic challenger to Republican incumbent Lisa Murkowski, who had been appointed to her seat by her father, former Senator then Governor Frank Murkowski. Knowles was at first thought likely to win by many, but he was narrowly defeated in the election.

Knowles is an outspoken opponent of capital punishment.
Knowles is pro-choice, and opposes restrictions on abortion at any stage of pregnancy. He vetoed several bills passed by the state legislature regarding abortion including a ban on intact dilation and extraction abortions.

On May 29, 2006, he announced his bid to return to the governor's office in 2006.  On August 22, 2006, Knowles defeated Eric Croft in the Democratic primary to become the Democratic nominee for Governor of Alaska in the general election.

On November 7, 2006, Knowles lost the Governorship in the general election to Republican Sarah Palin. Although many had predicted a close race, including pollsters for both parties, Knowles lost by 7 points, polling lower than in his 2004 bid for the U.S. Senate.

Obama administration

In September 2008, Knowles became president of the National Energy Policy Institute, a non-profit energy policy organization funded by billionaire George Kaiser's family foundation, and located at the University of Tulsa.

Due to his early support for Barack Obama, his status as a former governor of a western state, and his long-term involvement in oil and energy concerns, Knowles was discussed as a potential Secretary of the Interior or Secretary of Energy in an Obama cabinet. In December 2008 Knowles was passed over in favor of Steven Chu as Energy secretary, and passed over in favor of Ken Salazar as Interior secretary.

National Park System Advisory Board
On April 28, 2010, Knowles was appointed to the National Park System Advisory Board by Secretary of the Interior Ken Salazar.

After a change in administration in 2017, he opposed many of new Interior Secretary Ryan Zinke's policies, later claiming in his resignation letter that Zinke had no interest in the "mitigation of climate change; engaging young generations; evolving a more diverse culture of park visitors, advocates and employees; bringing our schools to our parks and our parks to our schools; stressing park urbanization; (and) protecting the natural diversity of wildlife." Knowles led a mass resignation in January 2018, citing differences with the Interior Department, especially Zinke.

Electoral history

References
Specific

General
 "Knowles to run for governor" by Matt Volz, Associated Press, May 29, 2006

External links
 
 

|-

|-

|-

|-

|-

1943 births
20th-century American politicians
20th-century American businesspeople
21st-century American politicians
United States Army personnel of the Vietnam War
American restaurateurs
Anchorage Assembly members
Businesspeople from Alaska
Businesspeople from Tulsa, Oklahoma
Candidates in the 2004 United States elections
Candidates in the 2006 United States elections
Democratic Party governors of Alaska
Living people
Mayors of Anchorage, Alaska
Military personnel from Oklahoma
Politicians from Tulsa, Oklahoma
Sarah Palin
United States Army officers
Yale University alumni